South Indian cuisine includes the cuisines of the five southern states of India—Andhra Pradesh, Karnataka, Kerala, Tamil Nadu and Telangana—and the union territories of Lakshadweep, Pondicherry, and the Andaman and Nicobar Islands. There are typically vegetarian and non-vegetarian dishes for all five states. Additionally, all regions have typical main dishes, snacks, light meals, desserts, and drinks that are well known in their respective region.

Native vegetables, fruits, and spices

Coconut is native to Southern India and spread to Europe, Arabia, and Persia through the southwestern Malabar Coast of South India over the centuries. Coconut of Indian origin was brought to the Americas by Portuguese merchants. Black pepper is also native to the Malabar Coast of India, and the Malabar pepper is extensively cultivated there. During classical era, Phoenicians, Greeks, Egyptians, Romans, and Chinese were attracted by the spices including Cinnamon and Black pepper from the ancient port of Muziris in the southwestern coast of India. During Middle Ages prior to the Age of Discovery which began with the end of the 15th century CE, the kingdom of Calicut (Kozhikode) on Malabar Coast was the centre of Indian pepper exports to the Red Sea and Europe at this time with Egyptian and Arab traders being particularly active. The similarities among the five southern states' cuisines include the presence of rice as a staple food, the use of lentils and spices, dried red chilies and fresh green chillies, coconut, and native fruits and vegetables including tamarind, plantain, jackfruit, snake gourd, garlic, and ginger.

Similarities and differences among cuisines

The similarities among the five states' cuisines include the presence of rice as a staple food, the use of lentils and spices, dried red chilies and fresh green chilies, coconut, and native fruits and vegetables including tamarind, plantain, snake gourd, garlic, and ginger.  The four cuisines have much in common and differ primarily in the spiciness of the food. From Kerala comes Malabari cooking, with its repertoire of tasty seafood dishes. Hyderabad is the home of the Nizams (rulers of Hyderabad) and ranges from spicy to sour to sweet. Hyderabadi food is full of nuts, dried fruits and exotic, expensive spices like saffron.

Kerala, Tamil Nadu, south and coastal Karnataka and most parts of Andhra Pradesh use more rice. People also consume ragi, or finger millet, in large quantities in southern Karnataka. North Karnataka, on the other hand, consumes more bajra (pearl millet)  and sorghum, while the Telangana state uses more jowar and pearl millet.

Telugu food

The cuisines of Andhra Pradesh and Telangana are the spiciest in all of India .  Generous use of chili and tamarind make the dishes tangy and hot.  The majority of dishes are vegetable- or lentil-based. The hot and spicy dishes are a speciality of the region. Mainly vegetarian dishes are served as part of the cuisine of the region.

Rice is the staple food of the region. Sambar is a special kind of dal prepared in Andhra Pradesh. A traditional Andhra meal comprises five kinds of dishes. To cool the stomach after a spicy meal, curd is served at the end.

Regional variations
The three regions of Telugu Land vary in their cuisines. The Telangana region, which shares borders with Central India and Vidharba, has more sorghum- and pearl millet-based roti in the staple diet.

The Rayalaseema districts share borders with eastern Karnataka and Tamil Nadu, and its cuisine has similarities to that of those regions. The more fertile Andhra coastal region has a long coastline along the Bay of Bengal, and its cuisine has a distinctive flavor with the inclusion of seafood.

Hyderabad, the capital of Telangana, has its own characteristic cuisine, which is considerably different from other Telugu cuisines. The Nizams patronise the Hyderabadi cuisine, which is very much like the Nawabi and Lucknowi cuisine.  The only difference is that the Nizams of Hyderabad prefer their food to be spicier, resulting in the distinct Hyderabadi cuisine, which includes delicacies like kacche gosht (raw meat) ki biryani, dum ka murgh (chicken cooked in Hyderabadi style), baghara baingan (eggplant), and achaari subzi (vegetable gravy with the taste of pickles).
All three regions — Coastal Andhra, Rayalaseema and Telangana — have distinctive cuisines, where in semi-arid Telangana state region millet-based breads (roti) is predominant staple food, while rice is predominant in irrigated Andhra and Rayalaseema regions and ragi is popular in Rayalaseema regions which is predominantly semi-arid. Many of the curries (known as koora), snacks and sweets vary in the method of preparation and differ in name, too.

Popular Andhra/Telangana dishes

Vegetarian

Tiffins (breakfast): pesarattu (mung bean pancake), attu, bobbatlu, pulihora or pulihaara (tamarind and lemon rice), upma

Pickles (pachhallu):(cut raw mango) pickle, maaghaya, gongura pachadi, pandumirapakayala pachadi, tomato pachadi, allam (ginger) pachadi, dosakaya pachadi, dosavakaya, chintakaya (tamarind)

Curries (kooralu): gutti vankaya, bendakaya fry, dondakaya fry, cabbage pesara pappu, carrot fry

Pappu (lentils) varieties: thotakura (amaranth–pigeon pea stew) pappu, chukkakoora pappu, menthikura pappu, palakura pappu (spinach – pigeon pea dal), dosakaya (yellow cucumber – pigeon pea stew), tomato, beerakaya, sorakaya

Pulusu: palakoora pulusu, sorakaya pulusu, thotakoora pulusu, anapakaya pulusu, gongura pulusu koora

Chaaru: tomato chaaru, miriyala chaaru (pepper), ulava chaaru

Chaaru and curd variations: perugupachadi/majjiga chaaru with potlakaya (snake gourd), sorakaya (bottle gourd)

Snacks: sakinalu, chekkalu, murukulu, jantikalu, chakkilalu

Sweets: pootarekulu, kaaja, ravva laddu, boondi laddu, pesara laddu, sunnundalu, thokkudu laddu, ariselu, nuvvula laddu

Chutney and pickles
Raw pachadi-vankaya pachadi, dosakaya vanakaya pachadi, tomato pachadi, cabbage pachadi, pickles of avakaya (mango), usirikaya (Indian gooseberry), ginger, citroen, gongura, tomato, garlic

Non-vegetarian
Hyderabadi biriyani and various Hyderabadi meat dishes make up part of Hyderabadi cuisine.  The rest of Telugu cuisine has various versions of lamb and chicken, and the coastal region has extensive varieties of seafood.  Dishes include kodi iguru (chicken stew), kodi pulusu (chicken gravy), chepa pulusu (fish stew), fish fry and prawn curry. Legend goes that the Nizam of Hyderabad had 49 types of Biryanis cooked in his kitchen which churned out delicacies that were an amalgamation of Turkish, Mughlai and Arabic influences blended with native Telugu and Maratha culinary traditions.

Karnataka food

Karnataka has a very diverse cuisine. Some of the most popular and traditional south Indian breakfast preparations like idli, vada and masala dosa are believed to have originated in the temple streets of Udupi in Karnataka. Described as being the mildest in terms of spice content among the cuisines of the five south Indian states, the traditional cuisine of Karnataka is known for its generous use of jaggery, palm sugar and limited use of chili powder; however, Northern Karnataka cuisine, which can be extremely hot in taste, is an exception. Since the percentage of vegetarians in Karnataka is higher than that of other southern states, vegetarian food enjoys widespread popularity.
Dating back to the Iron Age, Karnataka's cuisine is said to be one of the oldest surviving in the country. It combines a range of flavours, ingredients and cooking techniques from its neighbouring states of Kerala, Andhra Pradesh and Tamil Nadu to the south and Maharashtra to the north, along with its own rich gastronomic history.

Regional Karnataka cuisine

North Karnataka cuisine
In North Karnataka, the staple grains are sorghum and pearl millet, along with rice.  Rotis made out of these two grains, along with side dishes made of eggplant, fresh spiced salads of vegetables sometimes with raw lentils, spiced and stewed lentils are popular and routinely eaten.  North Karnataka people also consume a variety of spicy condiments including chutney powders — Shenga pudi (ಶೇಂಗಾ ಪುಡಿ), Gurella pudi (ಗುರೆಳ್ಳ ಪುಡಿ), agasi pudi (ಅಗಸಿ ಪುಡಿ), Ellu chatni pudi (ಎಳ್ಳು ಚಟ್ನಿ ಪುಡಿ)—, raw chutneys and pickles.  Of all the other regional cuisines in Karnataka, this is known for its fiery spice level and heat.  North Karnataka has a lower per capita meat consumption than most other areas of India. The entire taste and flavours vary from one region to another depending on the availability of ingredients. You can take delight in Udupi, Malnadu, Mangaluru, Kodagu, North and South Karnataka dishes which are worth relishing.
The north Karnataka cuisines include something like Jolada rotti (ಜೋಳದ ರೊಟ್ಟಿ), Thallipeet which is prepared tastily from Jowar flour. These rotties are enjoyed with spicy and mouthwatering curies namely; Enne kathirikai, Badane kaayi palaya, Jhunka etc. In addition to this you can also hunt for lip-smacking sweets such as Belgaum kunda, godi huggi, yellu and shenga holige, etc.

Coastal Karnataka cuisine
The cuisine of coastal Karnataka is marked by widespread use of seafood, coconut and coconut oil. Rice is the staple grain and is the centerpiece of every meal.  Gravies called "gassi" in Tulu language made from chicken, fish, meats are served with rice.  Lentils and vegetables cooked with coconut, spices and tempered with mustard, curry leaves, and generous asafoetida, in a dish called huli, is also served with rice.  A rasam-like preparation called saaru is also served with rice. The meal will also contain vegetable side dishes called palya.  Other accompaniments include curd-based tambli, sweet-tangy gojju, pickles and happala, sandige (fryums) or papads.  Some of the distinct breakfast foods served here include bun, biscuit roti, goli bajji, and patrode.The Mangalorean cuisine (Coastal Karnataka) is unique and diverse, owing to the different communities settled in the area. Curry leaves and coconut, along with local spices are the basic ingredients of most Mangalorean dishes. The famous local dishes include Neer dosa, Kori Rotti, Mangalore Buns and Macaroon, to name a few. Also being a coastal region, fish is the staple diet of many Mangaloreans. 

Popular pickles dishes include appemidi (found in Dandeli forest), bettada nelli, lemon, amateykai, and mixed vegetables. Chutneys include ground nut chutney, coconut chutney, and onion chutney.

Kodava cuisine
Coorgi cuisine is very distinct from the other regional cuisines of Karnataka, much like their culture.  The hallmark of Kodava cuisine is the widespread use of pork, game, and meats.  Kokum is generously used in their cooking.  The staple food remains rice and rice-based preparations like kadambattu, steamed rice dumplings and rice rotis.

South Karnataka cuisine

The south Karnataka or the old Mysore cuisine is dominated by ragi, or finger millet, and rice.  Ragi in the form of ragi mudde of dumplings or steamed rice is the centerpiece of a meal.  Often served with these two dishes are vegetable sides or palya, and a selection of soups known as saaru. Items commonly made are gojju (a type of thick sweet and sour gravy with vegetables), uppinakai (pickled vegetables), tovve (a very mild soup of lentils, sometimes with vegetables), huli (a spiced sour soup of lentils, tamarind, and vegetables), and tili saaru (a type of thin, peppery soup).  Certain preparations like bassaaru (a spiced soup of lentil stock with vegetables or greens), uppusaaru (a mild lentil stock based soup often accompanied with a raw chutney), masoppu (mashed spiced greens), and masekai (mashed spiced vegetables), are typical homestyle food from south Karnataka.

Avare kal (Indian beans) is a popular vegetable consumed during winter.  They are used in a variety of dishes including usali, uppittu, huli, and hitakida bele saaru.  Rice preparations usually served as the second course of a traditional meals include bisi bele baath, chitranna and puliyoggare (tamarind rice).You can savor on the most traditional dish that is Ragi mudde (Raagi ball) which is made from raagi flour. Ragi rotti, Akki rotti, Vangi bath, Kesari bath, Benne dose, Idli and Bisi bele bath are few other dishes you might like to taste.

Curd is a typical part of every meal in all the regions of Karnataka and is probably the most popular dairy product. Generally, yogurt with rice constitute the final course of a meal.  Buttermilk laced with spices and curry leaves is also served with meals, especially during the summer.  Ghee and butter are popular cooking mediums for those who can afford them, and are mostly reserved for festivals and special occasions. The South Karnataka cuisine is dominated by steamed rice, and ragi (finger millet) and the traditional dish is the Ragi ball (Ragi mudde). Other must-try dishes include Benne Dose (Butter dose), Akki Roti and Ragi Roti. Also, there is a vast variety of rice dishes, like Bisi bele bhath, Kesari Bath and Vangi Bath.

Udupi hotels
The credit for popularising these foods elsewhere in India goes to Udupi hotels.  In north India, Udupi hotels are often synonymous with south Indian food, even though the range of foods they serve is mostly restricted to the Karnataka cuisine. These small establishments serve inexpensive vegetarian breakfast dishes throughout the day all over India.  The hotels are mostly run by people native to the Canara region.  The famous masala dose traces its origin to Udupi cuisine and was subsequently popularised by Udupi restaurants. The Udupi cuisine emphasizes the use of local fruits, vegetables, grains and beans. It is entirely vegetarian food that makes use of jaggery, rice and coconut. It comprises different types of doses and spicy rices.

Karnataka dishes

Karnataka cuisine includes a wide variety of sweets. Belagavi Kunda, Mysore pak, obbattu/holige, dharwad pedha, pheni, and chiroti are some of the most popular sweets. Other lesser-known sweets include "hungu," kajjaya, coconut mithai, karjikai, rave unde, sajjappa, pakada pappu, chigali, a variety of kadubus, tambittu, paramaanna, and hayagreeva.  Most of these sweets are not milk-based, unlike the popular sweetmaking tradition elsewhere in India, but rather are made using jaggery instead of refined sugar. Kosambari (south Indian salad), Pickle, Palya (vegetable side dish), Raita or gojju (vegetable cooked in tamarind juice), desserts, fried dishes, Thovve (cooked dal), huli (a thick broth of lentils and vegetables), Chitranna (rice-based dish), plain rice.

Some typical breakfast dishes include masala dose, ragi rotti, akki rotti, Vangibath, menthya baath, tomato baath, khara baath, kesari baath, shaavige baath, davanagere benne dose, uppittu, plain, thatte idli (plate idli) and rave idli, Mysooru masale dose, kadubu, poori, and avalakki.

Lunch items include huli (sambar), thili (rasam), kootu, gojju, a delicacy called bisi bele baath, chitranna, kosambri (a type of salad), pachadi, and mosaru bajji.

Snack items include kodabale, chakkali, nippattu, maddur vade, aamb vade (aambode), goli bajji, and mangalore bun. Children enjoy the tangy Tamarind Chigali.

Kerala food

Kerala cuisine is very diverse,best classified on the basis of the various communities. Since Kerala's main export is coconuts, almost all of the dishes, irrespective of the variety in the cuisines of the different communities, have coconuts associated with them, either in the form of shavings or the oil or milk extracted from the nut. Seafood is also very popular in the coastal regions and eaten almost every day. Expect a generous use of coconut, chilli and spices, in mouth-tingling local recipes that differ with region and community.
Popular Kerala dishes:

Vegetarian: olan, paalpradaman, nendarangai chips, aviyal, pulissery, erucherri, sambar, sadhya, rasam, kalan, upperis, pachady, vegetable stew and kichadi

Non-vegetarian: With Greek, Roman, Chinese, Portuguese, Arab and Dutch traders making their way to the port towns of Kerala, it is no wonder that the food has been cast with a spectacular range of culinary influences. Though there are differences in the taste and style of preparations between north and south Kerala dishes, both use similar vegetables and ingredients. Plantains, coconut, gourds and yam are commonly used. Shrimp coconut curry, fish curry (various versions depending on the region), fish fry, chicken fry with shredded coconuts, fish pickle, podimeen fry, meen thoran (fish with coconut), karimeen (pearl spot fish) pollichathu, shrimp masala, chicken stew, mutton stew, malabari fish curry, fish molly, kallumekka, crabs, Pork Mappas (Panni Mappas), Pork vindallu (Panni Vindallu), Pork Roast, Thalassery biriyani, pearl spot fish, jewel fish, mussels, squid, kappa boiled, kappa (tapioca) vevichathu with non- vegetarian curries. Kerala_Beef_Fry otherwise known as beef ullarthiyathu is a common popular dish available through out Kerala.

Malabar biriyani is a rice cuisine using khyma rice instead of basmati rice.  This biriyani is known as Thalassery biriyani and is the only variety of biriyani in Kerala.

Snacks: upperi, payasam, banana fry (ethaykkappam or pazham pori), ullivada, kozhukkatta, avalosunda, unniyappam, neeyyappam, unnaykka, thira, churuttu, boli, modhakam, paal vazhaykka, cutlets, halwas, cakes, vattayappam, kinnathappam, and irattymadhuram

Breakfast: puttu (with banana, kadala curry or payyar curry[moong-dal cyrry]), Appam (velayappam, palappam) with curry, vegetable stew, fish molee, chicken or mutton stew, duck roast, pork masala, egg curry, and idiyappam with kadala curry, pidi with mutton curry or chicken curry, porotta with chicken curry/fry/roast or mutton curry/roast and, idli, dosai with chutney, kanji with dry beans, pickle, pappadam made with black lentils.

Typical Indian masala dosa (Kerala style), is a combination of shredded, cooked, and fried vegetables with Indian sauce and several spices as the basic stuffing, enveloped by a thick brown dosa made out of a dal and rice batter.  To embellish this unique preparation, it is served with hot sambhar and coconut chutney.

Tamil Nadu food

Tamil Nadu has always been a hub for food connoisseurs to take a great pleasure of some of the finest traditional cuisine in the country. The region is known to offer a wide variety of both vegetarian and non-vegetarian dishes with each holding a unique flavoursome taste.

A typical Tamil meal consists of many spicy and non-spicy dishes. Many of these dishes are generally mixed and eaten with steamed rice, which is the staple food of the region. Except for Brahmins and a couple of non-Brahmin castes, most Tamilians eat non-vegetarian food. However, on a typical day, a Tamil family will eat mostly vegetarian food, and the intake of meat is lower than in most parts of the world.

Restaurants serving Tamil food are traditionally of two types: so-called Saivam restaurants (serving only vegetarian food) and so-called Asaivam restaurant (serving both non-vegetarian and vegetarian food). Fresh coffee and tea remain a staple drink served in both restaurants.

Tamil cuisine groups dishes under five slightly overlapping categories.

Gravy dishes to be mixed in rice
The first category consists of dishes that necessarily are mixed with rice. The sub-categories under this head are: kuzhambu, sambar, paruppu, rasam, and thayir. There is a great variety of dishes under each sub-category. For example, under "kuzhambu", common dishes include puli kuzhambu, vaththal kuzhambu, Molagu kozhambu, payarru kuzhambu, and mor kuzhambu. Non-vegetarian kuzhambu such as chicken and fish curries are also now commonly mixed with rice meals.

Accompaniments
Foods in the second category are the side dishes that accompany such mixtures, including kootu, poriyal, varuval, thokku, aviyal, usuli, oorukaai, vadaam, vaththal and Pappadam.

Standalone snacks
The third category comprises short snacks and their accompaniments, including vada, bonda, bajji, various chutneys, and thayir Pachadi.

Dessert
The fourth category encompasses rich and sweet dishes that serve as desserts, including payasam, jigarthanda, kesari bhaat, pongal, palkova, poornalu, and a plethora of other Indian sweets.

Fast foods, or light meals
The fifth category includes "tiffin," or light meals, such as idlis, dosa, poori, pongal, uppma, idiyappam, aappam, adai, parotta, and paniyaram.  Preparations from the fifth category are served for breakfast and early dinners, and usually not as a midday meal.

Tamil cuisine primarily offers a light breakfast, a lighter dinner, a heavy midday meal and also evening snacks, which are often served with tea or coffee.  The rasam is mixed with rice, and usually eaten with crisps.  The last of the courses will invariably be rice with curd or yogurt, usually taken with pickles.

Throughout the meal, the side dishes are served and eaten with the courses, depending upon one's taste or choice. Side dishes are constantly replenished during any meal.  Desserts are served as the last course.  After the meal, guests retire to the living room and conclude with bananas and freshly made paan, consisting of betel leaves, betel nuts and lime.  Paan is considered a digestive aid.

Tamil non-vegetarian meals are similar, except that the first and second courses are usually replaced by various biryanis and non-vegetarian gravies.

In either case, a typical meal (lunch or dinner) will be served on a banana leaf.  Meals are often accompanied by various pickles and appalams.

Food is generally classified into six tastes: sweet, sour, salt, bitter, pungent and astringent.  A traditional Tamil culinary belief is that one should include all six tastes in each main meal eaten.  Each taste has a balancing ability and including some of each provides complete nutrition, minimises cravings and balances the appetite and digestion.

Sweet: milk, butter, sweet cream, wheat, ghee (clarified butter), rice, and honey
Sour: limes and lemons, citrus fruits, yogurt, mango, and tamarind
Salty: salt or pickles
Bitter: bitter gourd, greens of many kinds, turmeric, and fenugreek
Pungent: chili peppers, ginger, black pepper, clove, and mustard
Astringent: beans, lentils, turmeric, vegetables like cauliflower and cabbage, and cilantro

Chettinad cuisine 
Chettinad Cuisine is the cuisine of the Chettinad region of Tamil Nadu. The Chettinad region comprises 76 villages and 2 towns and is dominated by the Chettiar community. Cuisine of Chettinad is uses a variety of freshly ground spices including cumin, fenugreek, fennel, clove, bay leaf, turmeric and tamarind. The cuisine is well known for the complexity of flavours. Celebrated across the country for its brilliant variety of delicacies, Chettinad Cuisine is vibrant, vivid and vivacious by all means. The traditional cuisine of Tamil Nadu's Chettiar community, Chettinad cuisine has a culinary tradition unlike any other. Generally synonymous very spicy food, in reality, Chettinad cuisine is a complex blend of well-balanced flavours.
Chettinad cuisine is known for its use of a variety of spices in preparing mainly non-vegetarian food.  The dishes are hot and pungent with fresh ground masalas, and topped with a boiled egg that is usually considered an essential part of a meal.  They also use a variety of sun-dried meats and salted vegetables, reflecting the dry environment of the region.  The meat is restricted to fish, prawn, lobster, crab, chicken and mutton.  Chettiars do not eat beef and pork.

Most of the dishes are eaten with rice and rice-based accompaniments such as dosais, appams, idiyappams, adais and idlis.  The Chettinad people, through their mercantile contacts with Burma, learnt to prepare a type of rice pudding made with sticky red rice.

Chettinad cuisine offers a variety of vegetarian and non-vegetarian dishes. Some of the popular vegetarian dishes include idiyappam, paniyaram, vellai paniyaram, karuppatti paniyaram, paal paniyaram, kuzhi paniyaram, kozhakattai, masala paniyaram, adikoozh, kandharappam, seeyam, masala seeyam, kavuni arisi and athirasam.

Popular Chettinad dishes:

Vegetarian: kevar kalli, idli, sambar, vadai, rasam, dosa, thayir sadam (yogurt rice), thayir vadai (yogurt-soaked fritters), kootu (vegetables in wet style), poriyal/kari (vegetables in dry style), murukku, uthappam, idiappam, appalam (deep-fried lentil-flour crisps) and papadum (baked lentil-flour crips), freshly made thayir pachidi (yogurt mixed with fresh vegetables)

Non-vegetarian: karuvattu kuzhambu (salted, dried fish in sauce), chettinad pepper chicken, fish fry, and kanji with "old fish" gravy

Image gallery

See also
 Telugu cuisine
 Tamil cuisine
 Thalassery cuisine
 Chettinad cuisine
 Udupi cuisine
 Saraswat cuisine
 Mangalorean Catholic cuisine
 Cuisine of Kerala

References

 
cuisine